Shinahota, Shinahuta (also sometimes spelled Sinahota or Shinaota) is a small town in the Cochabamba Department in central Bolivia. It is the seat of the Shinahota Municipality, the second municipal section of the Tiraque Province.

See also 
 Carrasco National Park

References

 www.ine.gov.bo

External links 
 Map of Tiraque Province
 More info of Shinahota

Populated places in Cochabamba Department